Hurts has received one MTV Europe Music Awards nominations. Hurts has received Germany Musikexpress Style Award (October 18, 2010) in the Best Performer International category – it was the first award.

Awards and nominations

BT Digital Music Awards

|-
| 2011
| Don’t Let Go: An Interactive Novel on Spotify 
| Best Artist Promotion
| 
|}

Bambi Awards

|-
| 2010
| Themselves 
| Shooting-Star
| 
|}

Berlin Music Video Awards

|-
| 2016
| "Lights"
| Best Cinematography
| 
|-
| 2018
| "Beautiful Ones"
| Best Narrative 
|

Camerimage

!Ref.
|-
|2017
|"Beautiful Ones"
| Best Music Video
| 
|

ECHO Awards

|-
| rowspan="2"| 2011
| rowspan="2"| Themselves 
| Best International Newcomer
| 
|-
| Best International Band
| 
|}

Fonogram Awards

|-
| 2011
| Happiness
| Best International Album
| 
|-
| 2014
| Exile| Alternative Music Album of the Year
| 
|}

Gay Music Chart Awards

!Ref.
|-
| 2017
| "Beautiful Ones"
| Best Drag Queen Music Video
| 
|

Ibiza Music Video Festival

|-
| 2016
| "Lights"
| Best DOP
| 

MTV Germany Movie Awards

|-
| 2011
| Stay (film Kokowääh)
| Best Soundtrack for German Film
| 
|}

MTV Europe Music Awards

|-
| 2010 
| Themselves 
| Best Push Act
| 
|}

MVPA Awards

|-
| 2013
| "Miracle"
| Best International Video 
| 

Musikexpress Style Award

|-
| 18.10.2010
| Themselves 
| Best Performer International
| 
|}

NME Awards

|-
| rowspan="2"| 2011
| rowspan="2"| Themselves 
| Best New Band
| 
|-
| Best Band Blog or Twitter
| 
|-
| rowspan="4"| 2012
| rowspan="2"|Sunday| Best Video
| 
|-
| Best Track
| 
|-
| rowspan="5"| Themselves 
| Best Band Blog or Twitter
| 
|-
| rowspan="2"| Most Dedicated Fans
| 
|-
| rowspan="2"| 2014 
| 
|- 
| Best Band Blog or Twitter
| 
|-
| 2016
| Best Fan Community 
| 
|}

Popjustice £20 Music Prize

|-
| rowspan="2"|2010
| Wonderful Life  
| rowspan="2"|Best British Pop Single
| 
|-
| Stay
|  
|}

Q Awards

|-
| 2011
| Wonderful Life 
| Best Video
| 
|}

Swiss Music Awards

|-
| 2011
| Themselves 
| Best Breaking Act International
| 
|}

 UK Music Video Awards

|-
| 2010
| Better Than Love| Best Pop Video
| 
|-
| 2013
| Exile| Best Music AD
| 
|-
| rowspan="4"|2016
| rowspan="4"|Lights| Best Pop Video - UK
| 
|-
| Best Styling in a Video 
| 
|-
| Best Cinematography 
| 
|-
| Best Editing 
| 

Ultra-Music Awards

|-
| 2011
| Wonderful Life 
| Best International Song of the Year
| 
|}

Virgin Media Music Awards

|-
| 2011
| Themselves 
| Best Group
| 
|}

Xfm New Music Awards

|-
| 2011
| Happiness'' 
| Best British Debut Album of 2010
| 
|}

Žebřík Music Awards

!Ref.
|-
| 2010
| Themselves
| Best International Discovery
| 
|

Miscellaneous awards and honours

References

External links
 

Hurts